Forbidden Cargoes is a 1926 British silent adventure film directed by Fred LeRoy Granville and starring Peggy Hyland, Clifford McLaglen and James Lindsay.

Cast
 Peggy Hyland as Violet 
 Clifford McLaglen as John Tredennis 
 James Lindsay as Sir Charles 
 Guy Tilden Wright as Philip Sutton 
 Bob Vallis as Black Mike 
 J. Edwards Barker as Trefusis 
 Daisy Campbell as Lady Tredennis

References

External links

1926 films
British silent feature films
1926 adventure films
Films directed by Fred LeRoy Granville
Films set in Cornwall
Seafaring films
British black-and-white films
British adventure films
1920s English-language films
1920s British films
Silent adventure films